Heilly is a commune in the Somme department in Hauts-de-France in northern France.

Geography

History
During the First World War, being on the railway line Amiens-Albert meant receiving many of the dead bodies from the Battle of the Somme. Over 3000 graves are in the military cemetery.

Population

See also
Communes of the Somme department

References

Communes of Somme (department)